Adil Karrouchy is a Moroccan professional footballer, who plays as a defender for FAR.

International career
In January 2014, coach Hassan Benabicha, invited him to be a part of the Moroccan squad for the 2014 African Nations Championship. He helped the team to top group B after drawing with Burkina Faso and Zimbabwe and defeating Uganda. The team was eliminated from the competition at the quarter final stage after losing to Nigeria.

References

Living people
Moroccan footballers
Morocco A' international footballers
2014 African Nations Championship players
1982 births
Raja CA players
AS FAR (football) players
Place of birth missing (living people)
Association football fullbacks
Difaâ Hassani El Jadidi players
2016 African Nations Championship players